Elpida Hadzi-Vasileva (born 1971, Kavadarci, North Macedonia) is a Macedonian-born artist based in Brighton, UK. She has exhibited extensively and realised numerous commissions nationally and internationally, in gallery spaces, museums and within the public realm. Hadzi-Vasileva was selected by the Ministry of Culture to represent Macedonia at the 55th Venice Biennale in 2013, with Ana Frangovska, curator at the National Gallery of Macedonia. Hadzi-Vasileva attended the Royal College of Art, London and the Glasgow School of Art, Glasgow, Scotland.

Work 
Hadzi-Vasileva is a site specific installation artist who works across the varied media of sculpture, installation, video and sound, photography, and architectural interventions. This has included Ambush (2000), which was a temporary outdoor architectural intervention, where engineered tunnels were used to expose the roots of living trees with glazed roof areas allowing the visitors to see the world from below the ground, a project co-ordinated by Southern Arts, and hosted by ArtSway and the Forestry Commission.

Central to Hadzi-Vasileva's practice is a response to the particularities of place: its history, locale, environment and/or communities. She often uses materials that already have an existing link or history to the specific environment, which often results in new and unusual methods of working. Past works have included the use of organic materials, foodstuffs (butter, fish skins, chicken skins, internal animal organs, rice, and watercress) and precious metals (gold, silver, copper).

Awards 
Hadzi-Vasileva has been the recipient of many awards including the 2013 Alexandra Reinhardt Memorial Awards, to develop a new commission for mima, Middlesbrough and Engage, London. In 2010 she received an award of recognition for special achievements in the field of Fine Art for the development of the town of Kavadarci by the national Assembly of Kavadarci, Macedonia. She was also selected to represent Macedonia at the 55th Venice Biennale in 2013. She was recipient of the Pollock-Krasner Foundation award in 2002, was shortlisted for the Jerwood Sculpture Prize (2001), and Spitalfields Sculpture Prize (2010).

Residencies and commissions 
Hadzi-Vasileva was Artist in Restaurant at the Michelin-starred restaurant, Pied a Terre, London (2011). Other Artist in Residence awards have included mima, Middlesbrough (2013), Gloucester Cathedral (2008–2009), The Irish Museum of Modern Art (2005), The Berwick Gymnasium Fellowship (2001) and ArtSway (1999–2000). She was commissioned by Bristol City Council to develop permanent work, Transpire (2010) for St. Bede's Catholic College in Bristol, and Road to Nowhere (2002), a temporary work commissioned by The Samling Foundation for Kielder Forest, Northumberland. Other public art commissions have included Raison d'être (2010–2013), a permanent commission for Southgate Shopping Centre, in Bath; We Are Shadows (2008) at Unit2, London; Life Cycle (2004) at Knowle West Health Part, Bristol; Re|Sort (2002) at Fabrica Gallery, Brighton; and Ambush (2000) at Rhinefield Ornamental Drive, the New Forest.

References 

 IMMA
 Daily Express, '£30,000 for dead wood', Monday 16 August 2004
 Evening Post, 'We're rooting for Elpida', Tuesday 17 August 2004, p7
 Dnevnik, by Vesna I. Ilievska, January 2013
 Arts Council England, by South East, December 2012
 The Independent, by Alice Jones, September 2011 
 The Wall Street Journal, by Bruce Palling, September 2011
 Arts Council England, by South West, October 2009 
 AnOther, by Ananda Pellerin and Neil Wissink, October 2011 
 New Scientist, by Kat Austen, September 2011
 Mutual Art, by Lauren Meir, October 2011 
 The Guardian, by Hazel Davis, November 2009
 Utrinski Vesnik, by Katerina Bogoeva, November 2011

External links 
 Official Artist’s website

1971 births
Living people
British sculptors
Macedonian sculptors
British women sculptors
Installation artists
Macedonian contemporary artists
Artists from Brighton
Alumni of the Royal College of Art
People from Kavadarci
British people of Macedonian descent
Macedonian emigrants to the United Kingdom
Macedonian women sculptors
21st-century women artists